The A59 is a major road in England which is around  long and runs from Wallasey, Merseyside to York, North Yorkshire. The alignment formed part of the Trunk Roads Act 1936, being then designated as the A59. It is a key route connecting Merseyside at the M53 motorway to Yorkshire, passing through three counties and connecting to various major motorways. The road is a combination of historical routes combined with contemporary roads and a mixture of dual and single carriageway. Sections of the A59 in Yorkshire closely follow the routes of Roman roads, some dating back to the Middle Ages as salt roads, whilst much of the A59 in Merseyside follows Victorian routes which are largely unchanged to the present day.

Numerous bypasses have been constructed throughout the 20th century, one of the earliest being the Maghull bypass in the early 1930s, particularly where traffic through towns was congested. Portions of the route through Lancashire were proposed to be upgraded to motorway standard during the mid-20th century, latterly being downgraded to significant improvements then ultimately withdrawn from consideration. Sections of the road have previously been noted as being amongst the most dangerous in the country, particularly in Yorkshire, despite continued efforts to improve road safety.

Route

Merseyside
The A59 starts in Wallasey at the northern end of the M53 motorway and heading through the Kingsway Tunnel. In the centre of Liverpool, a separate  spur heads north from the roundabout junction at the entrance of the Queensway Tunnel, joining the main route at Scotland Road in Vauxhall. It continues north through Kirkdale and Walton, passing Aintree Racecourse and Ormskirk Road (forming the boundary between Aintree and Netherton), before reaching Switch Island junction where it meets the A5036, M57 motorway and the M58 motorway. From Switch Island, the A59 travels through Maghull and Lydiate, into Lancashire through Aughton and thence to Ormskirk, roughly parallel to the Merseyrail Northern Line path.

Lancashire
At Ormskirk, it reverts from a dual to single carriageway on an old bypass. The road follows through Burscough and Rufford, despite a bypass being considered for this section in the early 1980s, before reaching the A565 at Tarleton. The road continues over the Leeds and Liverpool Canal and River Douglas through to Longton (and Hutton) bypass, where it returns to dual carriageway. Passing Lancashire Police HQ, the road bypasses Penwortham and continues across the River Ribble into Preston, by-passing the city centre via Ring Way, where the A583 from Blackpool converges. It briefly merges with the A6 before heading East and meeting the M6 at junction 31, after which the road splits into two separate carriageways until it meets the A677 for Blackburn.

The A59 continues through Myerscough Smithy then runs around the perimeter of Samlesbury Aerodrome (a British Aerospace installation). As Longsight Road, it passes through Salesbury until meeting A666, at which point it bypasses Billington, Whalley then Clitheroe, Chatburn and the village of Sawley before reaching Gisburn.

Yorkshire

From Horton it enters North Yorkshire and goes through West and East Marton before meeting the A56, after which the road passes Broughton. Past Broughton, the road meets the Skipton bypass at its western end, where it overlaps the A65 on its route between Kendal and Leeds, de-merging with the A65 further to the east. The road continues over the Embsay and Bolton Abbey Steam Railway through a roundabout junction with the B6160 before rising up Beamsley hill. At the top of the hill, the road crosses into the Harrogate district, at which points there is a long narrow, twisting descent, known as Kex Gill, that leads to Blubberhouses village.

The A59 then runs along the head of Fewston Reservoir and follows the route of a Roman road past the 'golf balls' at Menwith Hill, an RAF station. As Skipton Road, the A59 then declines towards Harrogate passing Kettlesing. Reaching Harrogate as Skipton Road, it meets the A61 Ripon Road for Ripon, Harrogate town centre and Leeds, before continuing through the suburbs of the town as Skipton Road. This section of the A59 is widely considered to be one of the busiest roads in North Yorkshire. Part of this section travels across the Stray, an act-protected tract of grassy land which horseshoes around the town centre. The A59 then turns left at the Empress Roundabout, which is itself on the Stray, towards the suburb of Starbeck, although traffic travelling towards York is directed onto the A661 Wetherby Road to utilise the A658 Harrogate and Knaresborough Southern Bypass. The A59, however, continues to travel through Starbeck as Knaresborough Road and later High Street, then heads east to Knaresborough, passing through the town centre before heading towards York as York Road.

The remainder of the route is comparatively flat. From Knaresborough, the A59 meets up with York-directed traffic from Harrogate on the A658, and skirts to the north of Goldsborough towards the A1(M). The A59 heads towards York, travelling close to such places as Nun Monkton, Moor Monkton and Upper Poppleton before finally ending just to the south of the city walls at a zebra crossing at the junction of Bishopthorpe Road and Nunnery Lane, the A1036.

History

Early history
The A59 in Yorkshire from Green Hammerton to York follows the path of an old Roman road known locally as Watling Street and may in Medieval times have been used as a salt road. Archaeological digging in 2008 showed the Roman road crossing the River Nidd on an old county bridge prior to diverging north-east of Green Hammerton, contrary to previous understanding of the route. Evidence of ditches earlier than the Roman conquest of Britain were also uncovered during the archaeological dig in 2008, suggesting a road network present in the area dating back to the Iron Age.

19th century
Much of the present-day Merseyside alignment is unchanged over the last century, with the route through Liverpool to Switch Island junction in Aintree utilising existing road infrastructure from the Victorian era, such as Scotland Road. The present day alignment between Switch Island junction and Aughton, Lancashire via Maghull was non-existent prior to the 20th century, with the connecting roads being typically smaller lanes which still exist today. The A59's Ormskirk junction with the B5195 Turnpike Road is where the A59's continues along its Victorian alignment, known as Hollborn Hill before continuing through Ormskirk and West Lancashire.
In Clitheroe district prior to the opening of the new Chatburn road in 1827 the main Liverpool / Skipton route ran through Clitheroe town via Whalley road and Pimlico over the limestone ridge of Chatburn Old road. The original route in Sawley village skirted the River Ribble from Smithies bridge and may have used the relatively steep & narrow brow from near the Spread Eagle pub, alongside the River Ribble, prior to today's route the A59 ran up from Southport House.

20th century
The route from Liverpool to Leeds via Preston was one of many roads across the country to be designated a trunk road in the Trunk Roads Act 1936, being given the designation A59 and encompassing the alignment from Liverpool to Skipton.

This century saw the vast majority of the A59's bypasses constructed, some of which were built before trunking, including a bypass of Ormskirk town centre in Lancashire, which appeared on maps from 1929 onwards as "Byepass Road" and subsequently forming the A59. Numerous additional bypasses were built after the road was trunked, to realign the A59 away from routes where it may have previously travelled through busy towns and cities. One of the earliest examples is in Lancashire with the Longton Bypass, which was constructed during 1956–57 at an estimated cost of £491,000. Prior to the bypass, the A59 travelled through the villages of Walmer Bridge, Longton and Hutton before being realigned to their east.

In Yorkshire at Beamsley Hill, there are two lanes east-bound (on an incline) and a single lane west-bound, some of which was improved at various points during the late 20th century, such as in Hazlewood, where the A59 was rerouted to become a largely straight road, bypassing the now older winding route which exists to its north-west. The A59 was also rerouted just to the east of the Embsay and Bolton Abbey Steam Railway during the same period, requiring construction of a new Bolton Bridge over the River Wharfe, with the former alignment now forming a bridleway.

Up until the early 1970s, the start of the A59 was in the centre of Liverpool; this now forms a small spur connecting to the present day A59, which runs through the Kingsway Tunnel from its start point in Wallasey. The Birkenhead alignment of the A59 utilises a disused railway cutting to link the road up to the M53 motorway. In Lancashire, the A59 was realigned during the same period in the early 1970s, to bypass the towns of Clitheroe / Whalley plus the villages of Chatburn & Sawley. The Chatburn section includes a deep limestone cutting with the Downham road bridge overhead. Most of it was constructed as a single-carriageway despite parliamentary concerns that it would be less safe than a dual-carriageway. The Sawley brow section was 3 lanes with overtaking both ways, but following several serious accidents, is now only overtaking allowed on the uphill east-bound side. The bypass had been confirmed the year before at an estimated cost of £3.4 million.

The A59 stretch of the Skipton Bypass was opened in 1981 at an estimated cost of £16.4 million, crossing the B6265 north of the town and providing relief to traffic congestion.
The A59 was upgraded to primary status during the 1990s due to its increased perceived importance as an east–west route. This stretch of the route was claimed in 2004 to be one of the busiest roads in North Yorkshire.

Whilst now skirting to the north of Goldsborough towards the A1(M), originally the route went through the village of Flaxby and onto Allerton, but the route now travels a restricted east–west route and meets the A1(M) at its junction 47. The road originally ended to the south of Green Hammerton, with the A66 routed down from Boroughbridge and going into York.

Bypass improvements
The A59 in Yorkshire was part of North Yorkshire's 30-year transport plan in 2016, including maintenance of potholes and resurfacing works, as well as the potential construction of new routes.

Numerous sections of the route have been realigned at various stages, particularly where the previous alignment had travelled through busy villages or towns. Most have been constructed since the route was trunked and designated the A59, however some parts, such as the Maghull bypass, had been constructed prior to the Trunk Roads Act 1936.

A bypass has been proposed for the Kex Gill section of road that spans from Blubberhouses to the top of Beamsley Hill. The road has been closed on many occasions since 2010 (particularly in 2016 when it was closed for 8 weeks for emergency repair work). It was closed again due to a landslip in May 2018 and local planners have stated that a new section of road should be built to the north of the current route on the other side of a very small and narrow valley. North Yorkshire County Council have stated that they will start to construct the £30 million bypass in spring 2020. At the same time, they revealed that the closure and repairs bill for the section of the A59 at Kex gill was over £3 million for the period of 2009–2018. Plans for a  bypass were submitted in December 2019, with the cost expected to be around £43.7 million.

Motorway proposals

A bypass road for Ormskirk and Burscough respectively was first proposed as part of James Drake's 1949 Road Plan for Lancashire, described as an all-purpose road but later considered to be a potential motorway by 1958 and given the designation of A59(M). By 1963, Lancashire County Council had dropped the plans for a motorway of this nature, instead deciding to focus later efforts during the mid-1970s on proposing a scheme to improve the A59 link between Liverpool and Preston. This proposal was at the time considered to potentially become the M59 motorway, with investigations into all practical options being considered, however the motorway was ultimately never constructed. A map published by Lancashire County Council and dated 1974 shows the suggested route of the motorway, starting at the missing M58 motorway junction 2 and continuing north-bound towards Blackpool along the alignment of the A59.

Road safety
The A59 has persistently featured in the top 10 most dangerous roads in Britain. A report by The Sunday Times in 2004 branded a section of road between the towns of Skipton and Harrogate as being "the most hazardous primary route in the nation", suggesting that the cost to implement safety measures to reduce the number of incidents could be in the region of £3 million. North Yorkshire County Council claimed they were taking steps to reduce fatalities on the road and that accidents on the stretch in question was still too high, despite the number of accidents in 2003 being at its lowest in six years. The newspaper had also reported on the lives of those who have lost loved ones on the road.

In 2008 European Road Assessment Programme reported the risk of being involved in a death or disabling injury accident as being between Low-medium and Medium-high depending on the section of road travelled. There were renewed calls in 2017 to improve the A59 in Ribble Valley, Lancashire, with MP Nigel Evans describing the A59 as a "dangerous road" whilst requesting the police carry out a full audit of accidents in an effort to tackle the problem. A proposal to improve safety of the road between Skipton and Harrogate, which is the only direct route between the towns, was discussed by councillors in March 2017. Numerous possible re-alignments are being considered in an effort to minimize or eradicate the impact of road closures, which has cost the council almost £1 million.

Junctions and landmarks
There are numerous junctions along the route of the A59, including motorway and other A-road junctions. Major junctions and landmarks are listed below.

References

External links

Sabre page on the A59

Roads in Yorkshire
Roads in Lancashire
Roads in Merseyside
Transport in North Yorkshire
Borough of Harrogate
Transport in York